is a former Japanese football player.

Playing career
Mori was born in Takeo on April 17, 1980. After graduating from high school, he joined newly was promoted to J2 League club, Sagan Tosu based in his local in 1999. On April 14, he debuted against Cerezo Osaka in J.League Cup. His opportunity to play gradually increased from 2000. However he could not play at all in the match in 2004. In September, he moved to Japan Football League club ALO's Hokuriku. However he could not play many matches. After 1 year blank, he joined J2 club Mito HollyHock in 2006. However he could not play many matches and retired end of 2006 season.

Club statistics

References

External links

1980 births
Living people
Association football people from Saga Prefecture
Japanese footballers
J2 League players
Japan Football League players
Sagan Tosu players
Kataller Toyama players
Mito HollyHock players
Association football defenders